Pathare Budruk  is a village in Rahata taluka of Ahmednagar district in the Indian state of Maharashtra. It is located on banks of Pravara River.

Population
As per 2011 census, population of village is 3,771, of which 1,931 are males and 1,840 are females.

Economy
Primary occupation of village is agriculture and allied activities.

Transport

Road
Nearby villages Bhagwatipur, Hanmantgaon and Loni Bk. are connected by rural roads.

Rail
Shrirampur railway station is the nearest railway station to a village.

Air
Shirdi Airport is the nearest airport to a village.

See also
List of villages in Rahata taluka

References 

Villages in Ahmednagar district